Connellsville Area High School is a rural, public high school, located in Connellsville, Pennsylvania, United States of America. It is operated by the Connellsville Area School District. In the 2016–2017 school year, enrollment was reported as 1,138 pupils in 9th through 12th grades.
Connellsville Area Senior High School students may choose to attend Connellsville Area Career and Technology Center (also run by the Connellsville Area School District) for training in the construction and mechanical trades. The Intermediate Unit IU1 provides the school with a wide variety of services like: specialized education for disabled students and hearing, background checks for employees, state mandated recognizing and reporting child abuse training, speech and visual disability services and criminal background check processing for prospective employees and professional development for staff and faculty.

History

Connellsville Area SD was created in 1966, merging the Connellsville Joint and Dunbar Township School Districts. Students then utilized the current Junior High East Building until the present building was completed for the beginning of the 1970-71 school year .

Facilities
Outside the school are the district's baseball fields, softball fields, and tennis courts. In 2011, a $41 Million Dollar addition/renovation project took place within several phases. Phases  1 and 2 included renovating and moving the current library, replacing the entire physical plant, which one of two boilers from the original building were out of service, construction of school administrative offices as well as band classrooms, all of which were completed in the spring of 2012. The next phase included demolition and reconstruction of general classrooms, which students at the time were displaced during this phase. During the summer recess of 2012, the dietary department was renovated into a food-court type setting, giving students more food choices.
On September 4, 2012, with the closing of Junior High West, the district's ninth-graders began attending the Senior High, making it a Grade 9-12 facility. Also completed at this time was a new science addition as well as technological capabilities, including surround sound within the classrooms. In December 2012, in cooperation with the schools Patriots' Organization, a 4-ton piece of steel from the World Trade Center in New York from the September 11, 2001 attacks, was placed in the school's auditorium lobby. Final renovations  to the school were completed in time for the 2013-14 school year, which consisted of renovations to the main gym, pool, locker rooms, technology education classrooms and final site improvements.

Extracurriculars
The district offers a wide variety of clubs, activities and an extensive, publicly funded sports program.

Athletics

Notable alumni
 Al Lujack – professional basketball player for the Washington Capitols
 Johnny Lujack – 1947 Heisman Trophy winner while playing quarterback for the University of Notre Dame
 John Woodruff – 1936 Olympic gold medalist in 800 meters

References

External links
 
 Connellsville Area School District

Educational institutions established in 1970
Public high schools in Pennsylvania
Schools in Fayette County, Pennsylvania
1970 establishments in Pennsylvania